Dorset Council is the local authority for the unitary authority of Dorset in England. There are 82 councillors, who are elected every four years.

Political control
The council was created on 1 April 2019, when Dorset County Council and five of its six district councils merged to form a unitary authority. A "shadow authority" was created in 2018 to oversee the transition, comprising all the existing district and county councillors representing the area of the new authority. The first election to the new council was held in May 2019. Political control of the council has been held by the following parties:

Leadership
During the shadow period 2018–2019, Rebecca Knox, Conservative leader of the outgoing Dorset County Council served as leader of the shadow authority. At the first formal meeting of the new Dorset Council after its elections, Spencer Flower was appointed leader of the council. He had been the last leader of the former East Dorset District Council.

Council elections

The next election is due in 2023.

References

Dorset
 
Council elections in Dorset
Unitary authority elections in England